Events in 1981 in Japanese television.

Debuts

Ongoing
Music Fair, music (1964–present)
Mito Kōmon, jidaigeki (1969–2011)
Sazae-san, anime (1969–present)
 Fisherman Sanpei, anime (1980–1982)
Ōedo Sōsamō, anime (1970–1984)
Ōoka Echizen, jidaigeki (1970–1999)
Star Tanjō!, talent (1971–1983)
FNS Music Festival, music (1974–present)
Ikkyū-san, anime (1975–1982)
Panel Quiz Attack 25, game show (1975–present)
Doraemon, anime (1979–2005)

Endings

See also
1981 in anime
1981 in Japan
List of Japanese films of 1981

References